Hasret Kayikçi (born 6 November 1991) is a German footballer who plays as a striker for SC Freiburg and the Germany national team.

Club career
Kayikçi grew up in Heidelberg-Rohrbach and started her career at TSG Rohrbach. After a year in the federation league team (with 30 goals), she joined as a 16-year-old in the summer of 2008 to Bundesliga team FCR 2001 Duisburg and she debuted on 7 September 2008 against Herforder SV. A week later they scored a 4–3 away win against Hamburger SV; her first Bundesliga goal. In May 2011, she moved to SC Freiburg.  In April 2012, she sustained a new cruciate ligament injury, which initially remained undetected. After a long break, she participated in their first Bundesliga game in the 2012–13 season and scored a goal. After three games, Kayikçi was again kept out of action by a knee injury. She could attend a game in the 2013–14 season. After a long pause and rehab, she celebrated her comeback in the Bundesliga at start of the 2014–15 season on 30 August 2014.

International career
Kayikçi adopted German citizenship and was part of the squad of the U-17 national team for the World Cup in New Zealand. She also belonged to the squad of the U-19 national team for the European Championship in Macedonia. She suffered a cruciate ligament injury in the final group game.

International goals
Scores and results list Germany's goal tally first, score column indicates score after each Kayikçi goal.

Honours
FCR 2001 Duisburg
UEFA Women's Champions League: 2008–09
DFB-Pokal: 2008–09, 2009–10

References

External links
 
 

1991 births
Living people
German women's footballers
Germany women's international footballers
German people of Turkish descent
Sportspeople from Heidelberg
FCR 2001 Duisburg players
SC Freiburg (women) players
Women's association football forwards
Footballers from Baden-Württemberg
Frauen-Bundesliga players
UEFA Women's Euro 2017 players